The 2014 America East Conference baseball tournament was held from May 21 through 23.  The top four regular season finishers of the league's six teams met in the double-elimination tournament held at Edward A. LeLacheur Park in Lowell, Massachusetts, the home park of UMass Lowell.   won their third tournament championship, and second consecutive, to claim the America East Conference's automatic bid to the 2014 NCAA Division I baseball tournament.

Seeding and format
The top four finishers from the regular season will be seeded one through four based on conference winning percentage only.  The teams will play a double-elimination tournament.  UMass Lowell, despite hosting the event, is not eligible to participate as it transitions from Division II.  With one weekend left in the regular season, Stony Brook, Hartford, Maine, and Binghamton clinched berths in the Tournament.

Bracket

All-Tournament Team

Most Outstanding Player
Shaun McGraw was named Tournament Most Outstanding Player.  McGraw was an infielder for Binghamton, who collected four hits in the championship game..

References

America East Conference Baseball Tournament
Tournament
American East Conference baseball tournament
America East Conference baseball tournament
Baseball competitions in Lowell, Massachusetts
College baseball tournaments in Massachusetts